Irpex is a genus of corticioid fungi in the order Polyporales. Species produce fruit bodies that grow as a crust on the surface of dead hardwoods. The crust features an irpicioid spore-bearing surface (for which the genus is named), meaning it has irregular and flattened teeth. Irpex is distinguished from the similar genera Junghuhnia and Steccherinum by the simple septa found in the generative hyphae.

Classification
Although Irpex has been classified in the family Steccherinaceae, or the Meruliaceae, phylogenetic analysis has shown that its type species, Irpex lacteus, is more closely related to Byssomerulius in the Phanerochaetaceae. Justo and colleagues support a 2003 proposal that places Irpex as the type genus of family Irpicaceae.

Species
Irpex africanus Van der Byl (1934) – South Africa
Irpex alboluteus Rick (1959) – Brazil
Irpex aridus (Svrcek) Kotir. & Saaren. (2002)
Irpex castaneus Lloyd (1920)
Irpex conchiformis (Sacc.) Kotir. & Saaren. (2002)
Irpex consors Berk. (1878)
Irpex cremicolor Miettinen, Niemelä & Ryvarden (2007) – North Europe
Irpex destruens   Petch (1909)
Irpex epitephrus  Cleland (1936)
Irpex gracillimus Pilát (1925)
Irpex hacksungii J.S.Lee & Y.W.Lim (2009) – Korea
Irpex holoporus (Pers.) Sacc. & Traverso (1910)
Irpex hydnoides Y.W.Lim & H.S.Jung (2003)
Irpex irpicinus (Berk. & Broome) D.A.Reid (1963) – Australia
Irpex iyoensis Yasuda (1917)
Irpex javensis Lloyd (1925)
Irpex kusanoi Henn. & Shirai (1900)
Irpex lacteus (Fr.) Fr. ( 1828)
Irpex lamelliformis Lloyd (1917)
Irpex lepidocarpus (P.Karst.) Sacc. & Trotter (1912)
Irpex litschaueri (Bourdot & Galzin) Kotir. & Saaren. (2002)
Irpex longisporus  Rick (1959) – Brazil
Irpex longus Rick (1959) – Brazil
Irpex merulioides  (Berk. & Broome) Lloyd (1914)
Irpex microdon Rick (1959) – Brazil
Irpex mikhnoi (P.Karst.) Sacc. & Trotter (1912)
Irpex miyabei Lloyd (1923)
Irpex mukhinii (Kotir. & Y.C.Dai) Kotir. & Saaren. (2002)
Irpex narymicus (Pilát) Saaren. & Kotir. (2002)
Irpex noharae (Murrill) Sacc. & Trotter (1912)
Irpex ochrosimilis  Lloyd (1924)
Irpex owensii Lloyd (1916)
Irpex pallidus  Lloyd (1920)
Irpex palmatus (Berk.) Speg. (1959) – Rio de Janeiro
Irpex poria  Rick (1959) – Brazil
Irpex rickii Lloyd (1925)
Irpex roseotingens (Hjortstam & Ryvarden) Saaren. & Kotir. (2002)
Irpex sepiarius Lloyd (1917)
Irpex subhypogaeus Rick (1932)
Irpex subrawakensis (Murrill) Saaren. & Kotir. (2002)
Irpex tasmanicus  Syd. & P.Syd. (1903)
Irpex tiliaceus Pilát (1925)
Irpex tomentosocinctus Rick (1959) – Brazil
Irpex unicolor Lloyd (1920)
Irpex vagus  (Burds. & Nakasone) Saaren. & Kotir. (2002)
Irpex vellereus  Berk. & Broome (1873) – Philippines
Irpex versatilis  Lloyd (1917)
Irpex woronowii  Bres. (1920)

References

Fungi described in 1825
Meruliaceae
Polyporales genera
Taxa named by Elias Magnus Fries